Pilatovica is a mountain peak in the southern part of the Kopaonik range, in northern Kosovo. It is 1,703m high and just a few kilometres north-west of the Šatorica peak, which is 1,750m high.

Annotations

References

Sources

Kopaonik